Jerzy Zdzisław Gorzelik (born 25 October 1971, in Zabrze) is a Silesian politician and an art historian. He is the president of the Silesian Autonomy Movement and an advocate for decentralization of the Polish administrative structure.

References 

Silesian politicians
1971 births
Living people
Polish anti-communists